29 Nights is the début album by Danni Leigh. It was released in 1998 via Decca Records, and produced by Michael Knox and Mark Wright. The album includes the single "If the Jukebox Took Teardrops," which peaked at 57 on the Hot Country Songs charts.

Charlotte Dillon of Allmusic rated the album four stars out of five, praising the neotraditionalist country sound as well as the appearance of co-writes by Willie Nelson and Merle Haggard.

Track listing

Personnel
As listed in liner notes.
Richard Bennett – acoustic guitar, electric guitar
Peter Coleman – background vocals
Chad Cromwell – drums
Glen Duncan – fiddle
Carl Gorodetzky – conductor
Mike Henderson – harp
Steve Hinson – steel guitar, Dobro
Danni Leigh – lead vocals
Larry Marrs – bass guitar, upright bass, background vocals
Brent Mason – electric guitar
The Nashville String Machine – strings
Steve Nathan – piano, Wurlitzer electric piano, Hammond B-3 organ
Jim Ed Norman – string arrangements
Mike Noble – acoustic guitar, harp, mandola
Dale Oliver – electric guitar
Tammy Rogers – fiddle
Neil Thrasher – background vocals
Bergen White – string arrangements

Chart performance

References

Danni Leigh albums
Decca Records albums
1998 debut albums
Albums produced by Michael Knox (record producer)
Albums produced by Mark Wright (record producer)